Edmund Flynn may refer to:
 Edmund James Flynn, premier of Quebec
 Edmund W. Flynn, Rhode Island Supreme Court judge
 Edmund Power Flynn, member of the House of Commons of Canada

See also
 Edward Flynn (disambiguation)